Marc Joseph Meyohas (born June 1971) is a French, London-based businessman who is the managing partner in Greybull Capital, which he founded with his brother Nathaniel Meyohas.

Biography
Meyohas was born in Paris, France to a Sephardi Jewish family. His sister is New York artist Sarah Meyohas. He attended Clifton College in Bristol, United Kingdom and graduated from the University of Manchester with a BA in Economics (1990–1993). From January 1996 to December 2007 he was the chief executive officer of Cityspace. He later obtained British citizenship.

References

1971 births
Living people
Alumni of the University of Manchester
French chief executives
French people of Jewish descent
People educated at Clifton College